Norwegian DJ Kygo has released four studio albums, one extended play, 33 singles, 8 promotional singles, 13 remixes and 26 music videos. According to Recording Industry Association of America, Kygo has sold 10 million certified albums and singles in the US, including the multi-platinum hits "It Ain't Me" with Selena Gomez and "Higher Love" with Whitney Houston.

Studio albums

Extended plays

Singles

As lead artist

Promotional singles

Other charted songs

Guest appearances

Remixes

Record label release

Published remixes

Music videos

Production and songwriting credits

Notes

References

Discographies of Norwegian artists
Electronic music discographies